The Three Musketeers (also known as The Three Musketeers (The Queen's Diamonds)) is a 1973 swashbuckler film based on the 1844 novel by Alexandre Dumas. It is directed by Richard Lester from a screenplay by George MacDonald Fraser, and produced by Ilya Salkind. It stars Michael York, Oliver Reed, Frank Finlay, and Richard Chamberlain as the titular musketeers, with Raquel Welch, Geraldine Chaplin, Jean-Pierre Cassel, Charlton Heston, Faye Dunaway, Christopher Lee, Simon Ward, Georges Wilson and Spike Milligan.

The film adheres closely to the novel, and also injects a fair amount of humor. It was originally proposed in the 1960s as a vehicle for The Beatles, whom Lester had directed in A Hard Day's Night and Help!. It was shot by David Watkin, with an eye for period detail, in Madrid and Segovia, Spain. The fight scenes were choreographed by master swordsman William Hobbs. The musical score was composed by Michel Legrand.

The Three Musketeers premiered in France on December 11, 1973. It was both a critical and commercial success and was nominated for several awards, including five BAFTAs. Raquel Welch won a Golden Globe for her performance. A sequel shot back-to-back with its predecessor, The Four Musketeers, was released the following year.

Plot
Having learned swordsmanship from his father, the young country bumpkin d'Artagnan arrives in Paris with dreams of becoming a King's Musketeer. Unaccustomed to the city life, he makes a number of clumsy faux pas. First he finds himself insulted, knocked out and robbed by the Comte de Rochefort, an agent of Cardinal Richelieu, and once in Paris comes into conflict with three musketeers, Athos, Porthos, and Aramis, each of whom challenges him to a duel for some accidental insult or embarrassment. As the first of these duels is about to begin, Jussac arrives with five additional swordsmen of Cardinal Richelieu's guards. In the ensuing fight, d'Artagnan sides with the musketeers and becomes their ally in opposition to the Cardinal, who wishes to increase his already considerable power over the king, Louis XIII. D'Artagnan also begins an affair with his landlord's wife, Constance Bonacieux, who is dressmaker to the Queen, Anne of Austria.

Meanwhile, the Duke of Buckingham, former lover of the Queen, turns up and asks for something in remembrance of her; she gives him a necklace with twelve settings of diamonds, a gift from her husband. From the Queen's treacherous lady-in-waiting, the Cardinal learns of the rendezvous and suggests to the none-too-bright King to throw a ball in his wife's honor, and request she wear the diamonds he gave her. The Cardinal also sends his agent Milady de Winter to England, who seduces the Duke and steals two of the necklace's diamonds.

Meanwhile, the Queen has confided her troubles in Constance, who asks d'Artagnan to go to England and get back the diamonds. D'Artagnan and the three musketeers set out, but on the way the Cardinal's men attack them. Only d'Artagnan and his servant make it through to Buckingham, where they discover the loss of two of the diamond settings. The Duke replaces the two settings, and d'Artagnan races back to Paris. Porthos, Athos, and Aramis, wounded but not dead as d'Artagnan had feared, aid the delivery of the complete necklace to the Queen, saving the royal couple from the embarrassment which the Cardinal and Milady de Winter had plotted.

Inducted, to Constance's delight, into the Musketeers of the King's Guard, d'Artagnan exchanges meaningful looks with Milady de Winter.

Cast

Production

Development
According to George MacDonald Fraser, Richard Lester became involved with the project when the producers briefly considered casting The Beatles as the Musketeers, as Lester had directed two films with the group. The Beatles idea fell by the wayside but Lester stayed. It would be Lester's first film in five years, although he had been busy directing commercials and had sought finance for other projects in that time, including an adaptation of the novel Flashman by George MacDonald Fraser.

Lester says he had "never heard of" the Salkinds. They asked him if he was interested in doing The Three Musketeers and asked if he had read it. Lester said "Yes, I have read it, everybody's read it." He read "the first 200 pages, got excited and said yes".

Lester said the producers "wanted it to be a sexy film and they wanted it to be with big sexy stars" such as Leonard Whiting and Ursula Andress. He said "I just didn't say no to anything in the early stages" and that the "die was cast" when he was allowed to hire George MacDonald Fraser to write the script.

Fraser had never written a script before but thought that Flashman had the tone he was going for. In late 1972 Lester offered Fraser the job. According to Fraser, Lester originally said he wanted to make a four-hour film and cast Richard Chamberlain as Aramis. It was later decided to turn the script into two films. Fraser says he wrote them as two films, but no one told the actors.

Lester says Fraser wrote the scripts in five weeks and they were "perfect... just wonderful." "It's the journalism training," said Fraser.

Casting
Lester says the Salkinds left him alone creatively for most of the film apart from insisting that Raquel Welch and Simon Ward be cast. "Raquel is very big in all the small countries," said Ilya Salkind.

"I did the picture because of Dick Lester," said Charlton Heston.

In August 1973 Welch withdrew from the film due to creative and artistic differences. She announced she would instead make a film Decline and Fall of a Very Nice Lady. However Welch wound up rejoining the film.

Filming
The film was originally meant to be shot in Hungary. However after visiting the country Lester felt this would not be feasible, in part because of restrictions of the government on filming.

The movie ended up being shot in Spain over seventeen weeks. Locations included Segovia, where Lester had made A Funny Thing Happened on the Way to the Forum.

Lester says the producers assembled twenty minutes of footage and sold the film to 20th Century Fox.

Lester says Michel Legrand "had about a week and a half" to write the music.

Reception

Critical response
On Rotten Tomatoes the film has an approval rating of 88% based on reviews from 16 critics.

Variety gave the film a positive review, and wrote: "The Three Musketeers take very well to Richard Lester’s provocative version that does not send it up but does add comedy to this adventure tale." They praised the various performances, but noted that although Dunaway is underused she gets to make up for it in the sequel.

Vincent Canby of The New York Times wrote: "Mr. Lester seems almost exclusively concerned with action, preferably comic, and one gets the impression after a while that he and his fencing masters labored too long in choreographing the elaborate duels. They're interesting to watch, though they are without a great deal of spontaneity."

Awards and nominations

Salkind Clause
The film was originally intended to be an epic which ran for three hours including an intermission, but during production, it was determined the film could not make its announced release date in that form, so a decision was made to split the longer film into two shorter features, the second part becoming 1974's The Four Musketeers.

Though some actors knew of this decision earlier than others, by the time of the Paris premiere all had been informed. Screenwriter George MacDonald Fraser records the evening, "That not all the actors knew about this I didn't discover until the Paris premiere, which began with a dinner for the company at Fouquet's and concluded in the small hours with a deafening concert in what appeared to be the cellar of some ancient Parisian structure (the Hotel de Ville, I think).  Charlton Heston knew, for when we discussed it before dinner he shrugged philosophically and remarked: 'Two for the price of one.'"  This incensed the actors and crew, since they were being paid for one film, and their original contracts made no mention of a second feature, resulting in lawsuits being filed to receive compensation for salaries associated with the sequel.

This led to the Screen Actors Guild requiring all future actors' contracts to include what has become known as the "Salkind clause" (named after producers Alexander and Ilya Salkind), which stipulates that single productions cannot be split into film instalments without prior contractual agreement.

Sequels

The Four Musketeers was released the following year, with footage originally intended to combine with this film's to be part of a much longer film.

In 1989, much of the cast and crew of the original returned to film The Return of the Musketeers, loosely based on Dumas' 1845 novel Twenty Years After.

References

Bibliography

External links

 
 
 
 
 

1970s historical adventure films
American historical adventure films
American swashbuckler films
British historical adventure films
British swashbuckler films
Cultural depictions of Cardinal Richelieu
Cultural depictions of Louis XIII
Films scored by Michel Legrand
Films based on The Three Musketeers
Films directed by Richard Lester
Films featuring a Best Musical or Comedy Actress Golden Globe winning performance
Films shot in Madrid
Films set in France
Films set in Paris
Films with screenplays by George MacDonald Fraser
Films shot in Segovia
1970s English-language films
1970s American films
1970s British films